Cheshmeh Puneh may refer to:
 Cheshmeh Puneh, Kermanshah
 Cheshmeh Puneh, Razavi Khorasan